Mike Adras (born June 25, 1961) is an American college basketball coach. He most recently was the head men's basketball coach at Northern Arizona University. He was promoted from assistant coach after the 1998–99 season, when Ben Howland left for Pittsburgh.

Adras abruptly resigned on December 9, 2011, nine games into the 2011–12 season.  A month later, the Arizona Daily Sun revealed that during the summer of 2010, an internal investigation by NAU found numerous alleged violations of NCAA and NAU rules in the basketball program, including evidence that Adras had falsified practice logs.

He is now an 8th and 7th grade social studies teacher working at Temecula Middle School.

References

1961 births
Living people
Basketball coaches from Nevada
Bishop Gorman High School alumni
Drake Bulldogs men's basketball coaches
High school basketball coaches in Nevada
Northern Arizona Lumberjacks men's basketball coaches
San Jose State Spartans men's basketball coaches
Sportspeople from Las Vegas
UC Santa Barbara Gauchos men's basketball coaches
University of California, Santa Barbara alumni